Yielden Castle was a twelfth-century castle located in Yelden in the county of Bedfordshire, England.

Details
Yielden Castle has also been known, or recorded as, "Yeldon Castle", "Yelden Castle", "Giuelden Castle" and "Yielding Castle". It was a Motte-and-bailey castle that had two baileys. It was first mentioned in historical records in 1173 and was the stronghold of the Trailly family until the thirteenth century.  The castle was in decay by 1360.

Excavations were done on the site in 1881 and 1882. A thirteenth century stone curtain was found at that time.  Today, it is little more than an earthworks mound, though some remains can be seen. It is a Scheduled Monument.

See also
Castles in Great Britain and Ireland
List of castles in England

References
Britain Express
The Gatehouse

Castles in Bedfordshire
Scheduled monuments in Bedfordshire
Borough of Bedford